Princess Lalla Hasna of Morocco (born 19 November 1967 in Rabat) is the youngest daughter of King Hassan II and his wife, Lalla Latifa Hammou. She is sister to the current king, Mohammed VI and Prince Moulay Rachid.

Biography 

She was educated at the Royal College (Rabat).

Since her childhood, Princess Hasna has been interested in social and cultural activities, with special emphasis to environmental issues in Morocco. In 1999 she launched the national campaign for the protection of the environment and gave the prize for the most beautiful and cleanest beach in Morocco.

To shore up her work, the Mohammed VI Foundation for the protection of the environment was created in 2001 and chaired by Princess Hasna. She presides over the governing board of the foundation and regularly pays on the terrain visits to sensitize the population about environmental issues.

In 2002, Princess Lalla Hasna set up the prize of young reporters for the environment and in 2003 a prize for photography annually awarded on the international environment day.

She is Honorary President of the Hassanate Association for Human Development.

Princess Lalla Hasna and Dr. Khalil Benharbit (born 1959), MD, a cardiologist, got married in Fez on September 8 and 9, 1994. They have two daughters:

Lalla Oumaima Benharbit (born 15 December 1995).
Lalla Oulaya Benharbit (born 20 October 1997).

Business 
Lalla Hasna is the owner of a shell corporation that bought her an 11 million US dollar house near Kensington Palace in central London. According to the Pandora Papers, Hasnaa used the capital of the Moroccan royal family when buying the property. In the papers for the deal she stated that her profession is “princess”. Questions that were sent to the palace after Le Desk became known have so far remained unanswered.

Honours

National honours 
 Knight Grand Cordon of the Order of the Throne.

Foreign honours 
 Knight Grand Cross of the Royal Order of Isabella the Catholic (Kingdom of Spain, 22 September 1989).
 Knight Grand Cross of the Order of Leopold II (Kingdom of Belgium, 5 October 2004).
 Knight Grand Cross of the Order of the Aztec Eagle (United Mexican States, 11 February 2005).

Other honours 
 GOI Peace International Award (Tokyo, 23 November 2018).
 Honorary Doctorate in Sustainable Development from Ritsumeikan University  (Kyoto, 27 November 2018).

Ancestry

References

External links

Moroccan princesses
1967 births
Living people
People from Rabat
Moroccan businesspeople
Alumni of the Collège Royal (Rabat)
Recipients of the Grand Cross of the Order of Leopold II
Recipients of the Order of Isabella the Catholic
Knights Grand Cross of the Order of Isabella the Catholic
People named in the Pandora Papers
Daughters of kings